Clark Field, originally known as Varsity Athletic Field, was a stadium on the campus of the University of Texas at Austin. Clark Field hosted the Texas Longhorns football and track teams until they moved to the newly constructed Memorial Stadium in 1924. It also hosted the Texas baseball team until it moved to the second Clark Field in 1928 and the Texas Longhorns men's basketball team until it moved next door to the new Men's Gym in 1917.

The stadium opened in 1887 on part of the land at the southeast corner of 24th Street and Speedway At its peak of activity, the facility's wooden bleachers held 20,000 spectators. In 1904 it was named after former University of Texas regent, James Benjamin Clark.

In 1923, UT athletics director L. Theo Bellmont secured approval from the University's Board of Regents for construction of a permanent concrete stadium as a dual-purpose facility for the Texas football and track teams. Memorial Stadium, completed the following year, was built a short distance to the southeast of Clark Field. Following the 1927 baseball season, the University decided to develop the land and construct the Engineering Building, Taylor Hall, on the site of Clark Field, and the baseball team moved a short distance east to the second Clark Field.

From 1896 to 1924 Texas Football had a 135-23-3 record at Clark Field.

References

Defunct college baseball venues in the United States
Defunct college basketball venues in the United States
Defunct college football venues
Defunct sports venues in Texas
Texas Longhorns baseball venues
Texas Longhorns basketball venues
Texas Longhorns football venues
Baseball venues in Austin, Texas
1887 establishments in Texas
Sports venues completed in 1887
1928 disestablishments in Texas